Solomon Pappaiah (Tamil:சாலமன் பாப்பையா) (born 22 February 1936), also known as Solomon Pappiah and Salomon Pappayah is an Indian scholar and a television icon in Tamil Nadu, India.  He is best known for moderating debate talk shows, known as 'patti mandrams', which have been airing on Tamil Television Channels for quite a long time (for over three decades). He is credited for taking social themes to the masses and has so far moderated over 12,000 debates programmes across the globe. He is carrying Tamil literature service for almost 60 years and is considered one of the greatest Tamil scholars. His modest approach in speaking and life has earned him a large reputation among Tamil-speaking people throughout the world. He was awarded India's fourth highest civilian award, the Padma Shri, in 2021.

Early life
Born as the ninth child in a family of 12 to A. Sundaram and S. Pakkiam, Pappaiah had his job cut out as his father was a mill worker and did not have the wherewithal to financially support his studies. With financial help from his friends, he was able to continue his education. Arasu, his drawing master at the American College Higher Secondary School, taught him the skills. Professor Jothi Muthu of American College groomed his love for the language. Pappiah joined Thiagarajar College to pursue post-graduation in Tamil and became the first batch of MA Tamil students. He entered the public stage fray in 1960, while he was a lecturer at The American College. He rose to the position of Head of Department for Tamil in American college and extended his Tamil literature knowledge to all people through various forums. Eventually, he created a social awakening in the evolution of Patti Mandrams. He has also written and directed plays at college.

Speaking style
Pappaiah is known for his ‘down to earth' speaking style. His command of Tamil enables him to get complex literary issues across to the common man. This has enabled him to take social themes to the masses and bring about a social awakening in the evolution of Patti Mandrams in Tamil Nadu and beyond.

Awards and titles

 He is referred to as "Tamil Arignar" and "Iyal Kalai Arignar"
 He was awarded Kalaimamani by the Government of Tamil Nadu in 2000
 Annamalai University conferred him with "Muthamizh Perarignar" award in 2010
 He was awarded Padma Shri by the Government of India in 2021.

Writing
Solomon Pappaiah has penned four books: 
 Pattukottai Kalyanasundaram: Or Paarvai
 Urai Malargal
 Urai Kothu
 Tirukkural Uraiyudan
 Purananooru Puthiya Varisai Vagai

Acting
Pappaiah also appeared in two of director Shankar's film: Boys and Sivaji: The Boss.
Boys (2003) 
Sivaji: The Boss (2007)

Personal life
He is born at Sathangudi, Thirumangalam taluk, Madurai. Pappaiah and his wife Jeyabai reside in Madurai, India. They have a son and a daughter.

References

Sources

External links

1936 births
Writers from Madurai
Tamil male actors
Living people
Television personalities from Tamil Nadu
Male actors from Madurai
Tirukkural commentators
20th-century Indian journalists
Journalists from Tamil Nadu